Jack Hindle is the name of:

Jack Hindle (footballer, born 1921), English footballer for Barrow
Jack Hindle (footballer, born 1993), English footballer for Barrow